The 2013–14 Illinois Fighting Illini women's basketball team represented the University of Illinois at Urbana–Champaign during the 2013–14 NCAA Division I women's basketball season. The Fighting Illini, led by 2nd year head coach Matt Bollant, play their home games at the State Farm Center and were members of the Big Ten Conference. They finished with a record of 9–21 overall, 2–14 in Big Ten play for a last place finish. They lost in the first round of the 2014 Big Ten Conference women's basketball tournament to Iowa.

Roster

Schedule

|-
!colspan=9 | Exhibition

|-
!colspan=9| Regular Season

|-
!colspan=9 | 2014 Big Ten Conference women's tournament

Source

See also
2013–14 Illinois Fighting Illini men's basketball team

References

Illinois Fighting Illini women's basketball seasons
Illinois
Illinois Fighting Illini women's basket
Illinois Fighting Illini women's basket